The 2018–19 Texas Longhorns women's basketball team represented the University of Texas at Austin in the 2018–19 NCAA Division I women's basketball season. It was head coach Karen Aston's seventh season at Texas. The Longhorns were members of the Big 12 Conference and played their home games at the Frank Erwin Center. They finished the season 23–10, 12–6 in Big 12 play to finish in third place. They advanced to the championship game of the Big 12 women's basketball tournament where they lost to Iowa State. They received an at-large bid to the NCAA women's basketball tournament, as a 10th seed in the Portland Regional, where they lost to 7th seed Indiana in the first round.

Previous season
The Longhorns finished the season 28–7, 15–3 in Big 12 play to finish in second place. They advanced to the championship game of the Big 12 women's basketball tournament where they lost to Baylor. They received an at-large bid of the NCAA women's basketball tournament where they defeated Maine and Arizona State in the first and second rounds before losing to UCLA in the sweet sixteen.

Offseason

Departures

Incoming transfers

Recruits

|-
| colspan="7" style="padding-left:10px;" | Overall recruiting rankings:
|-
| colspan="7" style="font-size:85%; background:#F5F5F5;" | 

|}

Roster

Schedule

|-
!colspan=12 style=| Exhibition

|-
!colspan=12 style=| Non-conference regular season

|-
!colspan=12 style=| Big 12 regular season

|-
!colspan=12 style=| Big 12 Women's Tournament

|-
!colspan=12 style=| NCAA Women's Tournament

Rankings

^Coaches did not release a Week 2 poll.

2018–19 media

Television and radio information
Most University of Texas home games were shown on the Longhorn Network, with national telecasts on the Big 12 Conference's television partners. On the radio, women's basketball games aired on KTXX-HD4 "105.3 The Bat", with select games on KTXX-FM 104.9.

See also
 2018–19 Texas Longhorns men's basketball team

References

Texas Longhorns women's basketball seasons
Texas
Texas Longhorns
Texas Longhorns
Texas